Nowosielce Kozickie  (Novosil’tsi Kozyts’ki) is a village in the administrative district of Gmina Ustrzyki Dolne, within Bieszczady County, Subcarpathian Voivodeship, in south-eastern Poland.

References

Nowosielce Kozickie